The Kabul Premier League was created in 2006 in order to improve the Afghan national team and extend season of some Afghan Premier League teams. In the first division there are 12 teams, which play each other once a season inside Ghazi Stadium in Kabul. Games must be held on different days due to lack of stadiums.

Clubs 2010/11 
Ferozi F.C. (Kabul)
Ordu Kabul F.C. (Kabul)
Khurasan Kabul F.C. (Kabul)
Seramiasht F.C. (Kabul)
Esteqlal F.C. (Kabul)
Javan Azadi Kabul F.C. (Kabul)
Javan Minan Kabul F.C. (Kabul)
Pamir Kabul F.C. (Kabul)
Hakim Sanayi Kabul F.C. (Kabul)
Shooy Kabul F.C. (Kabul)
Solh Kabul F.C. (Kabul)
Maiwand Kabul F.C. (Kabul)
Sabawoon Kabul F.C. (Kabul)

League champions
Champions were: 
 1946: Ariana Kabul F.C.
 1947: Ariana Kabul F.C.
 1948: Ariana Kabul F.C.
 1949: Ariana Kabul F.C.
 1950: Ariana Kabul F.C.
 1951: Ariana Kabul F.C.
 1952: Ariana Kabul F.C.
 1953: Ariana Kabul F.C.
 1954: Ariana Kabul F.C.
 1955: Ariana Kabul F.C.
 1956-94: Not Known
 1995: Karlappan
 1996: Not Known
 1997-98: Maiwand Kabul FC
 1999-02: Not Known
 2003: Red Crescent Society
 2004: Ordu Kabul F.C.
 2005: Ordu Kabul F.C.
 2006: Ordu Kabul F.C.
 2007: Ordu Kabul F.C.
 2008: League wasn't played because of war, Ordu Kabul F.C. named champion
 2009: Kabul Bank F.C.
 2010: Feruzi F.C.
 2011: Big Bear F.C.
 2012: Feruzi F.C.
 2013: Big Bear F.C.

Most titles (2006-present)
The number of national championships that clubs in Afghanistan have attained since 2006.

References

External links

https://web.archive.org/web/20100114144028/http://www.aff.com.af/English%20News.html

 
Football leagues in Afghanistan
Sports leagues established in 2006
2006 establishments in Afghanistan